Trouble in Mind is a 1985 American neo-noir film written and directed by Alan Rudolph and starring Kris Kristofferson, Keith Carradine, Geneviève Bujold, and Lori Singer, with an out-of-drag appearance by Divine. The story follows an ex-cop just released from jail after serving time for a murder sentence as he returns to the mean streets of the fictional "Rain City", inspired by and filmed in Seattle.

Plot
In the mysterious metropolis of Rain City, a former policeman, Hawk, is out of prison after serving eight years on a murder rap. He returns to his former hangout, Wanda's Cafe, run by his former love, Wanda.

New arrivals in town are the down on his luck: Coop, his naive wife Georgia and their baby boy, Spike. In desperate need of money, Coop goes to work for a gangster, Solo, but he isn't very good at his job.

Hawk, meanwhile, begins to develop a protective and even romantic attachment to Georgia, who is hired by Wanda to be a waitress. Coop runs afoul of the mob boss in town, Hilly Blue, leading to a wild shootout at Hilly's unique mansion.

Cast
 Kris Kristofferson as John Hawkins – "Hawk"
 Keith Carradine as Coop
 Lori Singer as Georgia
 Geneviève Bujold as Wanda
 Joe Morton as Solo
 Divine as Hilly Blue
 George Kirby as Lieutenant Gunther
 John Considine as Nate Nathanson
 Dirk Blocker as Rambo
 Albert Hall as Leo
 Gailard Sartain as Fat Adolph
 Robert Gould as Mardy Stoog

Production
"Rain City" was filmed at Seattle locations, largely older areas on the edges of downtown, giving an impression of a less modern city.

The music, performed by Marianne Faithfull, was arranged and accompanied by Mark Isham. The film begins with the 1920s blues standard "Trouble in Mind" and ends with a song of love and reassurance, both performed by Faithfull.

Peter R. Tromp (now Peter Trump, author of Milk the Children and Poems and Portions) provided music as Divine's strolling violinist. In the Chinatown restaurant scene, Tromp performed Pachelbel's Canon in D and J.S. Bach's Brandenburg Concerto No. 3. During scenes filmed at the Seattle Art Museum, Tromp performed Telemann's Fantasia No. 6, "Autumn" from Vivaldi's Four Seasons, Mozart's Eine kleine Nachtmusik, Biber's Passacaglia, and Reveille. Tromp's appearance and music in Trouble in Mind were uncredited.

Release
Trouble in Mind was entered into the 36th Berlin International Film Festival.

Shout! Factory released a 25th anniversary DVD of the film on December 14, 2010.

Reception
The film has received generally positive reviews, and holds an 80% "fresh" rating on Rotten Tomatoes, based on 15 reviews.

Film critic Roger Ebert gave the film four stars in his review, noting Rudolph's combination of style and emotional sincerity that is aware of being funny. He describes it as a "movie that takes place within our memories of the movies." Ebert later named it #5 on his list of the best movies of 1986. Walter Goodman of The New York Times was less enthusiastic; he wrote that Rudolph "seems to be striving to say something but isn’t able to break through the fog of the script."

In his book Rainer on Film, critic Peter Rainer included Trouble in Mind in a section on underseen films.

References

External links
 
 
 
 

1985 films
1985 crime drama films
American crime drama films
American independent films
Films set in Seattle
Films shot in Washington (state)
1980s English-language films
Films directed by Alan Rudolph
American neo-noir films
Films scored by Mark Isham
1985 independent films
1980s American films